John Hetherington & Sons was a textile machinery manufacturer from Ancoats, Manchester in England, founded in 1830

History

John Hetherington & Sons was founded in 1830. The company gradually expanded and acquired a number of factory buildings in Ancoats. It established the Vulcan Works on Pollard Street in around 1856 and left these buildings in 1939 when the Lancashire cotton industry was in decline.

The company then moved to the Union Iron Works at West Gorton. The Vulcan Works was still used until 2004, when it was sold to a property developer for conversion into flats.

In the recession of the 1930s, Platt Brothers, Howard and Bullough, Brooks & Doxey, Asa Lees, Dobson and Barlow, Joseph Hibbert, John Hetherington and Tweedales and Smalley merged to become  Textile Machinery Makers Ltd., but the individual units continued to trade under their own names until the 1970, when they were rationalised into one company called Platt UK Ltd. In 1991 the company name changed to Platt Saco Lowell.

References

Literature 
 Richard Marsden: Cotton spinning: its development, principles, and practice. Publisher: George Bell and sons, London  1884

External links 
Timeline John Hetherington and Sons in: Grace's Guide
1921 John Hetherington & Sons Catalogue with description of machines
Details for lap machines; John Hetherington & Sons, Pollard Street, Ancoats, Manchester (England) 1890
Details for Heilmann combers

Defunct companies based in Manchester
Manufacturing companies based in Manchester
Textile machinery manufacturers
Defunct manufacturing companies of the United Kingdom
1830 establishments in England